The 155th New York State Legislature, consisting of the New York State Senate and the New York State Assembly, met from January 6 to December 14, 1932, during the fourth year of Franklin D. Roosevelt's governorship, in Albany.

Background
Under the provisions of the New York Constitution of 1894, re-apportioned in 1917, 51 Senators and 150 assemblymen were elected in single-seat districts; senators for a two-year term, assemblymen for a one-year term. The senatorial districts consisted either of one or more entire counties; or a contiguous area within a single county. The counties which were divided into more than one senatorial district were New York (nine districts), Kings (eight), Bronx (three), Erie (three), Monroe (two), Queens (two) and Westchester (two). The Assembly districts were made up of contiguous area, all within the same county.

At this time there were two major political parties: the Democratic Party and the Republican Party. The Socialist Party and the Communist Party also nominated tickets.

Elections
The New York state election, 1931, was held on November 3. No statewide elective offices were up for election.

Assemblywoman Rhoda Fox Graves (Rep.), of Gouverneur, a former school teacher who after her marriage became active in women's organisations and politics, was re-elected, and remained the only woman legislator.

Sessions
The Legislature met for the regular session at the State Capitol in Albany on January 6, 1932; and adjourned on March 11.

Joseph A. McGinnies (Rep.) was re-elected Speaker.

The Legislature met for a special session at the State Capitol in Albany on December 9, 1932; and adjourned on December 14. This session was called to enact legislation to avoid the financial breakdown of New York City which threatened to occur on December 17.

State Senate

Districts

Members
The asterisk (*) denotes members of the previous Legislature who continued in office as members of this Legislature. Joe R. Hanley changed from the Assembly to the Senate.

Note: For brevity, the chairmanships omit the words "...the Committee on (the)..."

Employees
 Clerk: A. Miner Wellman

State Assembly

Assemblymen

Note: For brevity, the chairmanships omit the words "...the Committee on (the)..."

Employees
 Clerk: Fred W. Hammond

Notes

Sources
 Members of the New York Senate (1930s) at Political Graveyard
 Members of the New York Assembly (1930s) at Political Graveyard

155
1932 in New York (state)
1932 U.S. legislative sessions